Nischal Gurung, better known by his criminal alias Chakre Milan, is a Nepali gangster. A self-proclaimed don, he is one of the two most powerful gang leaders in Nepal, the other being Deepak Manange, his arch-rival. Chakre refers to Chakrapath of Kathmandu, where he was born and is based.

Chakre Milan was attacked by a gang of 15 men led by Deepak Manange in May 2004. He nearly lost his hand in the attack that involved swords. Chakre Milan's brother led an attack with swords and Khukuris in retaliation, which Manange survived. Manange was convicted of attempted murder and sentenced to five years in prison for the incident. Milan was at one time thought to be under the political protection of CPN UML leader Pradeep Nepal.

Chakre Milan's criminal record goes back to 2001, when he was first arrested for allegedly attacking Prince Dhirendra's son-in-law with a sword. He has been arrested multiple times since, including on charges of attempted murders with swords or guns.

References

Nepalese gangsters
People from Kathmandu District
Date of birth missing (living people)
Year of birth missing (living people)
Living people
Gurung people